Andrzej Sermak (born 29 November 1962) is a retired Polish football midfielder.

References

1962 births
Living people
Polish footballers
Victoria Jaworzno players
Ruch Chorzów players
Hutnik Nowa Huta players
GKS Katowice players
Association football midfielders